In mathematical logic, an algebraic sentence is one that can be stated using only equations between terms with free variables.  Inequalities and quantifiers are specifically disallowed.  Sentential logic is the subset of first-order logic involving only algebraic sentences.

Saying that a sentence is algebraic is a stronger condition than saying it is elementary.

Related
Algebraic theory
Algebraic definition
Algebraic expression

Mathematical logic